List of system-on-a-chip suppliers.

 Actions Semiconductor
 Advanced Micro Devices (AMD)
 Advanced Semiconductor Engineering (ASE)
 Alchip
 Allwinner Technology
 Altera
 Amkor Technology
 Amlogic
 Analog Devices 
 Apple Inc.
 Applied Micro Circuits Corporation (AMCC)
 ARM Holdings
 ASIX Electronics
 Atheros
 Atmel
 Axis Communications
 Broadcom
 Cambridge Silicon Radio
 Cavium Networks
 CEVA, Inc.
 Cirrus Logic
 Conexant
 Cortina Systems
 Cypress Semiconductor
 Freescale Semiconductor
 Fujifilm
 HiSilicon
 Imagination Technologies
 Infineon Technologies
 Integra Technologies
 Intel Corporation
 InvenSense
 Lattice Semiconductor
 Leadcore Technology
 LSI Corporation
 Marvell Technology Group
 MediaTek
 Maxim Integrated Products
 Milkymist
 MIPS Technologies
 MStar Semiconductor
 Nokia
 NVIDIA
 NXP Semiconductors (formerly Philips Semiconductors)
 Open-Silicon
 PMC-Sierra
 Qualcomm
 Redpine Signals
 Renesas
 Rockchip
 Ruselectronics
 Samsung Exynos
 Sharp
 Sigma Designs
 SigmaTel
 Silicon Integrated Systems
 Silicon Motion
 Skyworks Solutions
 Socionext
 SolidRun
 Spreadtrum
 STMicroelectronics
 ST-Ericsson
 Telechips
 Tensilica
 Teridian Semiconductor
 Texas Instruments
 Transmeta
 Vimicro
 Virage Logic
 WonderMedia
 Xilinx
 Zoran Corporation

Electronic design
Lists of technology companies
System on a chip